Cat Lake Airport  is located adjacent to the Cat Lake First Nation, Kenora District, Ontario, Canada, on the central north shore of Cat Lake.

Airlines and destinations

References

External links
Page about this airport on COPA's Places to Fly airport directory

Certified airports in Kenora District